Season 1887–88 was the twelfth season in which Heart of Midlothian competed at a Scottish national level, entering the Scottish Cup for the twelfth time.

Overview 
Hearts reached the fourth round of the Scottish Cup losing to St Mirren after 3 replays.

Later that season they reached the Semi Final of the East of Scotland Shield losing to Hibs.

Results

Scottish Cup

East of Scotland Shield

Rosebery Charity Cup

See also
List of Heart of Midlothian F.C. seasons

References 

 Statistical Record 87–88

External links 
 Official Club website

Heart of Midlothian F.C. seasons
Hearts